Pearls – Amii Stewart Sings Ennio Morricone is a studio album by Amii Stewart released in 1990. The album which covers many of film composer Ennio Morricone's best known songs was recorded with Rome's Philharmonic Orchestra.
The album has been re-released as My Heart And I, Desire, One Love, Saharan Dream and Here's To You.

Track listing

"My Heart and I" - 4:56
"Desire (Chi Mai)" - 3:41
"Hurry to Me" - 4:08
"Come Sail Away" - 4:46
"Here's to You" - 3:50
"Song for Elena" - 4:45
"One Love" - 4:04
"Saharan Dream" - 3:07
"Sean Sean" - 3:36
"Could Heaven Be" - 1:58

Personnel
 Amii Stewart - vocals

References

1990 albums
Amii Stewart albums
Ennio Morricone albums